Daasanach (also known as Dasenech, Daasanech, Dathanaik, Dathanaic, Dathanik, Dhaasanac, Gheleba, Geleba, Geleb, Gelebinya, Gallab, Galuba, Gelab, Gelubba, Dama, Marille, Merile, Merille, Morille, Reshiat, Russia) is a Cushitic language spoken  by the Daasanach in Ethiopia, South Sudan and Kenya whose homeland is along the Lower Omo River and on the shores of Lake Turkana.

Writing system
Jim Ness and Susan Ness of Bible Translation and Literacy and Wycliffe Bible Translators devised a practical spelling and published a 1995 alphabet book. Yergalech Komoi and Gosh Kwanyangʼ published another alphabet book in 1995. An edition of the Gospel of Mark was published in 1997, and other Bible translations were published with this spelling in 1999.

A revision of this spelling is adopted, replacing the digraph ‹dh› by the d with a horizontal stroke through the bowl ‹ꟈ›.

Vowels can be given with the acute accent, or the circumflex accent .

Notes

Further reading
 Sasse, Hans-Jürgen. 1976. "Dasenech" in: Bender, M. Lionel (ed.): The Non-Semitic Languages of Ethiopia. pp. 196–221. East Lansing: African Studies Center.

External links
Linguistic map of Daasanach language at Muturzikin.com
 World Atlas of Language Structures information on Dhaasanac

Western Omo–Tana languages
Languages of Ethiopia
Languages of Kenya